Tony Seymour may refer to:

Tony Seymour, character in Ann's An Idiot
Tony Seymour, character in Accused (film)

See also
Anthony Seymour (disambiguation)